Arantxa Tapia (born 1963) is a Spanish politician affiliated with the Basque Nationalist Party.

From December 2012 to November 2016, she served as Minister for Economic Development and Competitiveness in the First Urkullu Government led by Iñigo Urkullu. From November 2016 to September 2020, she served as Minister for Economic Development and Infrastructures in the Second Urkullu Government led by Iñigo Urkullu. , she serves as Minister for Economic Development, Sustainability and the Environment in the Third Urkullu Government.

References 

1963 births
Living people
Place of birth missing (living people)
Basque Nationalist Party politicians
Government ministers of the Basque Country (autonomous community)
Basque women in politics
People from Donostialdea
University of Navarra alumni
Members of the 10th Congress of Deputies (Spain)